Kubok may refer to:
 Azerbaijan Cup
 Kazakhstan Cup
 Russian Cup (disambiguation), any of several Russian sports competitions
 Ukrainian Cup, a national knockout cup competition in Ukrainian football